Jassa falcata, commonly known as scud, is a tube-dwelling amphipod.

Ecology
Jassa falcata constructs tubes of debris. It is a fouling organism, growing on the bottoms of ships and slowing them down. J. falcata forms dense mats or nests. The male and the female live in different tubes. J. falcata feeds generally on hydroid growth on the bottom of rafts and ships. It is generally a suspension feeder normally found on sediment areas.

Description
Amphipods have two pairs of antennae. In J. falcata the first antennae have two-segmented flagella and are shorter and more slender than the second antennae. Males are 7–13 mm long and females are 6–12 mm. Colours vary but are usually yellow-grey with brown, red or black patches depending on the colour of the habitat.

Distribution
Jassa falcata is found on all British coasts. It has also been reported in several sites around the coast of Ireland.

References

Corophiidea
Crustaceans of the Atlantic Ocean
Crustaceans described in 1808
Taxa named by George Montagu (naturalist)